Paul Gerhardt (12 March 1607 – 27 May 1676) was a German theologian, Lutheran minister and hymnodist.

Biography
Gerhardt was born into a middle-class family at Gräfenhainichen, a small town between Halle and Wittenberg. His father died in 1619, his mother in 1621. At the age of fifteen, he entered the Fürstenschule in Grimma. The school was known for its pious atmosphere and stern discipline. The school almost closed in 1626 when the plague came to Grimma, but Paul remained and graduated from there in 1627. In January 1628 he enrolled in the University of Wittenberg. There, two teachers in particular had an influence on him: Paul Röber and Jacob Martini. Both of these men were staunch Lutherans, promoting its teachings not only in the classroom but in sermons and hymns. Röber in particular often took his sermon texts from hymns. In this way Gerhardt was taught the use of hymnody as a tool of pastoral care and instruction.

Gerhardt graduated from the University of Wittenberg around 1642. Due to the troubles of the Thirty Years War it seems he was not immediately placed as a pastor, and thus moved to Berlin where he worked as tutor in the family of an advocate named Andreas Barthold. During his time in Berlin his hymns and poems brought him to the attention of Johann Crüger, the cantor and organist at the Nicolaikirche in Berlin. Crüger was impressed by Gerhardt's hymns and included many of them in his Praxis pietatis melica. The hymns proved popular, and Gerhardt and Crüger began a collaboration and friendship that continued for many years.

In September 1651, Gerhardt received his first ecclesiastical appointment as the new Probst at Mittenwalde (a small town near Berlin). It was during his time in Mittenwalde when he composed most of his hymns. Also while there he married Anna Maria Barthold, one of the daughters of Andreas Barthold. Their first child was born there in 1656, but died in infancy; a memorial tablet in the church shows their grief.

While Gerhardt was a devoted pastor in Mittenwalde it appears he missed Berlin. In 1657 he was called to be a Deacon (Associate Pastor) to the Nikolaikirche of Berlin. He seems to have had some hesitancy about leaving Mittenwalde since it was only after long deliberation that he accepted the appointment.

When Gerhardt came to Berlin he found a city full of strife between the Lutheran and Reformed clergy. The Elector at the time was Friedrich Wilhelm I of Brandenburg, who was Reformed. He wanted to make peace between the clerical factions, but being Reformed himself, he concentrated most of his efforts on making his lands more Calvinist. He placed only Reformed pastors into parishes, removed the Lutheran professors from the University of Frankfurt and forbade students from his lands to study at the University of Wittenberg.

He also sponsored a series of conferences between the Lutheran and Reformed clergy in the hopes of having them arrive at some consensus, but the result was the opposite: the more the two sides argued, the further apart they found themselves. Gerhardt was a leading voice among the Lutheran clergy, and drew up many of the statements in defense of the Lutheran faith. At the same time he was renowned for acting fraternally not only with the Lutherans but also with the Reformed clergy; he was respected and very well liked by all. His sermons and devotional writings were so free from controversy that many among the Reformed attended his services, and the wife of the Elector, Louisa Henrietta, was a great admirer of him and his hymns.

The Elector, however, was growing impatient with a lack of success at his conferences. He put an end to them in 1664 and published his "syncretistic" edict. Since the edict disallowed the Formula of Concord, one of the Lutheran Confessions as contained in the Book of Concord, many Lutheran clergy could not bring themselves to comply with the edict. Gerhardt was thus removed from his position in 1666.

The citizens of Berlin petitioned to have him restored, and owing to their repeated requests an exception to the edict was made for Gerhardt, although his conscience did not allow him to retain a post which, appeared to him, could only be held on condition of a tacit repudiation of the Formula of Concord. For over a year he lived in Berlin without fixed employment. During this time his wife also died, leaving him with only one surviving child. Ironically the edict was withdrawn a few months later, although by this time his patroness, Electress Louisa Henrietta had died as well and so he was still without a position. In October 1668 he was called as archdeacon of Lübben in the duchy of Saxe-Merseburg, where, after a ministry of eight years, he died on 27 May 1676.

Gerhardt is considered Germany's greatest hymn writer. Many of his best-known hymns were originally published in various church hymn-books, as for example in that for Brandenburg, which appeared in 1658; others first saw the light in Johann Crüger's Geistliche Kirchenmelodien (1647) and Praxis pietatis melica. The first complete collection is the Geistliche Andachten, published in 1666–1667 by Ebeling, music director in Berlin. No hymn by Gerhardt of a later date than 1667 is known to exist.

The life of Gerhardt has been written by Roth (1829), by Langbecker (1841), by Schultz (1842), by Wildenhahn (1845) and by Bachmann (1863); also by Kraft in Ersch's und Gruber's Allg. Encyc (1855). A short biography was also done by William Dallmann, reprinted in 2003. The best modern edition of the hymns, published by Wackernagel in 1843, has often been reprinted. There is an English translation by Kelly (Paul Gerhardt's Spiritual Songs, 1867).

Commemoration

Paul Gerhardt is commemorated on 26 October in the Calendar of Saints used by some Lutheran churches in the United States, on which day the achievements of Philipp Nicolai and Johann Heermann are also commemorated. 

A plaque in Wittenberg marks his lodgings, close to the university.

Hymns 

Johann Sebastian Bach used several single stanzas of Gerhardt's hymns in his church cantatas, motets, Passions and Christmas Oratorio. The hymn "" is the base for Bach's chorale cantata BWV 92.

Hymn texts by Gerhardt, listed with a translation of the first line, associated hymn tune, base, liturgical occasion, the number in the current German Protestant hymnal  (EG) and the Catholic Gotteslob (GL), use in Bachs works (BWV numbers between 1 and 200 are cantatas, BWV 245 is the St John Passion, BWV 244 is the St Matthew Passion, BWV 248 the Christmas Oratorio, BWV 439–507 appear in Schemellis Gesangbuch), and/or notes:

References

External links 

 Paul Gerhardt 1607–1676 from The Cyber Hymnal
 Theodore Brown Hewitt. Paul Gerhardt as a Hymn Writer and His Influence on English Hymnody New Haven: Yale University Press. 1918
 
 
 In Behalf of Paul Gerhardt and the Elenchus
 Paul Gerhardt's Spiritual Songs, trans. J. Kelly, 80 pages, 1867.
 
 
 Paul-Gerhardt-Gemeinde Mannheim

1607 births
1676 deaths
People from Wittenberg (district)
People from the Electorate of Saxony
17th-century German Lutheran clergy
German Lutheran theologians
German Lutheran hymnwriters
German poets
Writers from Saxony-Anhalt
People celebrated in the Lutheran liturgical calendar
University of Wittenberg alumni
German male non-fiction writers
17th-century hymnwriters
German-language poets
Paul Gerhardt
17th-century Lutheran theologians